The International Association of Mathematical Physics (IAMP) was founded in 1976 to promote research in mathematical physics. It brings together research mathematicians and theoretical physicists, including students. The association's ordinary members are individual researchers, although associate membership is available to organizations and companies. The IAMP is governed by an executive committee elected by the ordinary members.

The association sponsors the International Congress on Mathematical Physics (ICMP), which takes place every three years, and it also supports smaller conferences and workshops. There is a quarterly news bulletin.

IAMP currently awards two kinds of research prizes in mathematical physics at its triannual meetings, the Henri Poincaré Prize (created in 1997) and the Early Career Award (created in 2009).

List of presidents 

The presidents of the IAMP since its foundation were:
2021-23: Bruno Nachtergaele
2015-20: Robert Seiringer
2012-14: Antti Kupiainen
2009-11: Pavel Exner
2006-08: Giovanni Gallavotti
2003-05: David Brydges
2000-02: Herbert Spohn
1997-99: Elliott Lieb
1991-96: Arthur Jaffe
1988-90: John R. Klauder
1985-87: Konrad Osterwalder
1982-84: Elliott Lieb
1979-81: Huzihiro Araki
1976-78: Walter Thirring

Prizes awarded by IAMP

Henri Poincaré Prize 
The Henri Poincaré Prize is sponsored by the Daniel Iagolnitzer Foundation to recognize outstanding contributions in mathematical physics, and contributions which lay the groundwork for novel developments in this broad field. The Prize was also created to recognize and support young people of exceptional promise who have already made outstanding contributions to the field of mathematical physics.

The prize is usually awarded to three individuals every three years at the International Congress on Mathematical Physics (ICMP). The prize committee is appointed by the IAMP.

IAMP Early Career Award 
The prize is awarded at the International Congress on Mathematical Physics (ICMP) in recognition of a single achievement in Mathematical Physics, for scientists whose age is less than 35.

List of Past IAMP Congresses (ICMP) 
A list of past congresses may be found here.

See also 
 Mathematical physics
 International Congress on Mathematical Physics
 Henri Poincaré Prize

External links 
 

Mathematical physics
Mathematical societies
Mathematics organizations
Physics organizations
Physics societies
Scientific organizations established in 1976